Mauroceras is a genus of minute sea snails, marine gastropod mollusks or micromollusks in the family Caecidae.

Species
 Mauroceras amamiense (Habe, 1978)
 Mauroceras boucheti (Pizzini & Raines, 2011)
 Mauroceras kajiyamai (Habe, 1963)
 Mauroceras legumen (Hedley, 1899)
 Mauroceras maestratii (Pizzini, Raines & Vannozzi, 2013)
 Mauroceras rhinoceros (Pizzini, Raines & Vannozzi, 2013)
 Mauroceras sandwichense (de Folin, 1881)
 Mauroceras serratum (Vannozzi, 2017)

References

 Vannozzi A. (2019). Mauroceras, a new genus for Indo-West Pacific species hitherto assigned to Meioceras (Gastropoda: Caecidae). Bollettino Malacologico. 55(1): 55–61.

External links
 

Caecidae